Hulu Japan, known simply as Hulu in Japan, is a Japanese subscription video on-demand over-the-top streaming service owned and operated by HJ Holdings, Inc., a subsidiary of Nippon TV.

Hulu Japan was launched in September 2011 as the Japanese version of the American streaming service Hulu. Hulu Japan was acquired by Nippon TV in 2014.

History 
On September 1, 2011, Hulu, a video distribution service operating in the United States, launched its first overseas expansion in Japan. The business in Japan was to be conducted by Hulu Japan GK, a wholly owned subsidiary of Hulu. The company signed content distribution agreements with CBS, NBC, 20th Century Fox, Warner Bros. and The Walt Disney Company. Users were charged a monthly fee of 1,480 yen, and unlike in the U.S., no free service was offered.

The Japanese user base is characterized by a relatively large number of customers viewing on smartphones and tablets compared to the United States. Compared to the U.S., more Japanese viewers use smartphones and tablets to watch movies. In addition, the trend in frequency and viewing time shows that many viewers are watching a single movie in "small segments," said Kazushi Sawa, General Manager, Content & Alliance Division, Hulu Japan GK.

In January 2012, Hulu Japan began streaming films owned by Toho-Towa, a distribution company primarily responsible for the release of Universal films in Japan. The following month, Hulu Japan announced that it had signed contracts to distribute content from Japanese film distributors Asmik Ace Entertainment, Kadokawa Shoten, Shochiku, Toei, Nikkatsu, and AMG Entertainment to distribute their content.

The fee was reduced to 980 yen in April 2012. The number of users of the service exceeded 1.85 million as of March, seven months after its launch. In November 2013, the company announced a partnership with TBS Television to distribute over 3,000 episodes of TBS content. At the time, the service delivered approximately 14,000 titles.

On February 28, 2014, Nippon TV announced that it would acquire Hulu's Japan market operations from Hulu, LLC for an undisclosed amount; the new company, HJ Holdings GK, established by Hulu LCC through a corporate separation, will become a subsidiary of Nippon TV. "I’m confident that the Hulu business in Japan is in very good hands, and Nippon TV will take the service to new heights, with the added benefit of allowing us to focus on our growing business here in the U.S." said Hulu CEO Mike Hopkins.  Even after the acquisition by Nippon TV, Hulu continued to distribute works from NHK, TBS Television, and TV Tokyo on its platform.

In March 2015, the service surpassed 1 million members.

In June 2015, Hulu Japan released its first original drama series, The Last Cop, a remake of the German drama series Der letzte Bulle. In October, a sequel drama series was co-produced with Nippon TV and broadcast on Nippon TV. A sequel was released in theaters on May 3, 2017 as Last Cop The Movie and grossed 400 million yen at the box office.

On April 1st, 2017, HJ Holdings GK changed its corporate structure and became a KK through organizational restructuring.

On May 8, 2017, Hulu Japan announced its renewa. The reason for the renewal was that, despite Nippon TV's acquisition of Hulu Japan, Hulu Japan's distribution system was common with that of the U.S., and thus could not undergo Japan-specific modifications. In addition, the URL of "hulu.jp" has been changed to "happyon.jp". The reason for the change was to reduce risk during the system migration, and to make the transition without stopping the service. This sudden change in the URL made users anxious that the name of the service might be changed, or that the service structure might be drastically altered.

On May 17, the renewal took place, but the service could not be used properly for several days. Also, without notice, changes were made to the copyright protection rules, and some users who had externally connected their displays were unable to view the service. This situation caused Hulu to offer users "Hulu 1 month free ticket", "Amazon gift certificate (1000 yen)" or "iTunes code (1000 yen)", and also caused the first decrease in users since the acquisition.

On May 16, 2017, Hulu Japan announced that it had 1,551,595 paid subscribers in March. In July 2017, however, the service announced that subscribers fell by 3,787 to 1,547,812 in June.

In July 2017, HJ Holdings conducted a third-party allotment of shares with Hulu LCC, Yahoo! Japan, Toho, Yomiuri TV, and Chukyo TV as subscribers. The purpose was to strengthen the management foundation and enable the production and procurement of more attractive content and significantly improve promotional capabilities.

In September 2019, the service URL returned to "hulu.jp"

Hulu Japan launched its TVOD service, Hulu Store, on June 10, 2020. The store is available for SVOD  members. In June 2022, Hulu introduced a new feature called "Points" which allows users to rent or purchase videos from the Hulu Store on the Hulu app for Android and iOS devices. This feature enables users to make one-time purchases of content within the app.

References

External links 

 

Hulu Japan
Nippon TV
Internet television streaming services
Subscription video on demand services